Herbert C. Reed was an American football coach.  He served as the head football coach at Hillsdale College in Hillsdale, Michigan for five seasons, from 1908 until 1912, compiling a record of 7–9–5.

References

Year of death missing
Year of birth missing
Hillsdale Chargers football coaches